Tatara Station is the name of two train stations in Japan:

 Tatara Station (Gunma) (多々良駅)
 Tatara Station (Tochigi) (多田羅駅)